Maria Elektrine Freifrau von Freyberg, born at Strasbourg in 1797, was the daughter and pupil of Johann Baptist Stuntz, a painter of landscapes, under whose tuition she gave proof of great ability. She visited France and Italy, and stayed at Rome some time. Her paintings of historical scenes are distinguished for a tender touch, and she was not less successful in portraiture and landscape painting. One of her best works is a Holy Family. The Birth of St. John, and two landscapes, in the album of King Louis of Bavaria, are by this artist; in the Leuchtenberg Gallery The Virgin and Child, and The Three Maries at the Tomb; and in the Munich Gallery a Holy Family, The Naming of St. John the Baptist, and A Boy playing the flute. She died at Munich in 1847.

See also
 List of German painters

Notes
 

1797 births
1847 deaths
19th-century German painters
German women painters
Artists from Strasbourg
19th-century German women artists